The 2022 Winter Olympics in Beijing televised by a number of broadcasters throughout the world. As with previous years, Olympic Broadcasting Services will produce the world feed provided to local broadcasters for use in their coverage. In most regions, broadcast rights to the 2022 and 2024 Olympics were packaged together, but some broadcasters obtained rights to further games as well.

Broadcasters
In some countries, broadcast rights to the 2022 Winter Olympics are already agreed upon through existing long-term deals. In France and the United Kingdom, these are the first Games where Eurosport will be the main rightsholder; the BBC will sub-license a limited amount of coverage on free-to-air television, as part of a deal in which the BBC sold the pay-TV rights to the 2018 and 2020 Games to Eurosport.

In China, domestic rights to these Games are owned by China Central Television (CCTV), with live rights being sublicensed by China Mobile's Migu streaming service.

In the United States, these Games will once again be broadcast by NBCUniversal properties, as part of its US$7.75 billion contract to air the Olympics through 2032. 

Notes

Diplomatic boycott
Indian public broadcaster Doordarshan is part of India's diplomatic boycott and will not air live the opening and closing ceremonies of the Games.

References

2022
2022 Winter Olympics